Mussonena is a genus of air-breathing land snails, terrestrial pulmonate gastropod mollusks in the family Camaenidae.

Species 
Species within the genus Amphidromus include:
 Mussonena campbelli

References

 Nomenclator Zoologicus info

 
Camaenidae
Taxonomy articles created by Polbot